Lilith Saintcrow is an American author of urban fantasy, historical fantasy, paranormal romance and steampunk novels. Saintcrow was born in New Mexico. She currently resides in Vancouver, WA.

Saintcrow uses the  nom de plume  Lili St. Crow when writing for the teenage market.

Her local newspaper, The Columbian, describes her novels as "atmospheric and stylish."

Bibliography

As Lilith Saintcrow

Stand Alone Novels 
Selene (2008)
The Demon's Librarian (2009)
Taken (2011)
Unfallen (2011)
Squirrel Terror (2013)
Pack (2014)
Blood Call (2015)
Rose & Thunder (2015)
The Marked (2016)
She Wolf and Cub (2017)
Cormorant Run (2017)
Desires, Known (2017)
Fish (2017)
Afterwar (2018) – Afterwar is described in a Los Angeles Times review as "incredibly timely, well written and important."
Beast of Wonder (2018)
Jozzie & Sugar Belle (2018)
Rattlesnake Wind (2018)
Incorruptible (2019)
Harmony (2019)
Moon's Knight (2021)

Non fiction 

 The Quill and The Crow: Volume 1 (2013)

Dante Valentine 
Dante Valentine series. One reviewer describes the series as depicting "a world controlled by magic rather than psychic powers." Set 600 years in the future, Working for the Devil, was described by one reviewer as a book that "mixes cyberpunk and schlock science, involving a missing map of the devil's DNA, with endless set-piece fights, all-round mayhem and vivid sex, and does it well enough to be forgiven. "

Jill Kismet

Bannon & Clare (Steampunk)

The Watcher

Romance of the Arquitaine (Historical Fantasy) 
The Hedgewitch Queen (2011)
The Bandit King (2012)

Gallow and Ragged 

 Trailer Park Fae (2015)
 Roadside Magic (2016)
 Wasteland King (2016)

Steelflower Chronicles 
Steelflower (2007)
Steelflower at Sea (2017)
Steelflower in Snow (2018)

The Society Series 
The Society (2005)
Hunter, Healer (2005)

Roadtrip Z

Super Agents

Hood 

 Season One (2019)
 Season Two (2020)
 Season Three (2021)

Ghost Squad 

 Damage (2021)

As Lili St. Crow

Tales of Beauty & Madness 

 Nameless (2013)
 Wayfarer (2014)
 Kin (2015)

Strange Angels

As Anna Beguine

Stand Alone Novels 

 Shane (2017)

Angelov Wolves 

 Love, Bite (2017)

The Keepers

 Smoke (2007)
 Mirror (2007)

As S.C. Emmett

Hostage of Empire 

 The Throne of the Five Winds (2019)
 The Poison Prince (2020)
 The Bloody Throne (2022)

Anthologies and collections 
She has also published several short stories  and the free online serial Selene (with characters from her Dante Valentine series).

References

1976 births
21st-century American novelists
21st-century American short story writers
American fantasy writers
American romantic fiction writers
American women novelists
American women short story writers
Living people
Steampunk writers
Urban fantasy writers
Women romantic fiction writers
21st-century American women writers